Caesium carbonate or cesium carbonate is a white crystalline solid compound. Caesium carbonate has a high solubility in polar solvents such as water, alcohol and DMF. Its solubility is higher in organic solvents compared to other carbonates like potassium and sodium carbonates, although it remains quite insoluble in other organic solvents such as toluene, p-xylene, and chlorobenzene. This compound is used in organic synthesis as a base. It also appears to have applications in energy conversion.

Preparation
Caesium carbonate can be prepared by thermal decomposition of caesium oxalate. Upon heating, caesium oxalate is converted to caesium carbonate with emission of carbon monoxide. 

Cs2C2O4 → Cs2CO3 + CO

It can also be synthesized by reacting caesium hydroxide with carbon dioxide.

2 CsOH + CO2 → Cs2CO3 + H2O

Chemical reactions
Caesium carbonate facilitates the N-alkylation of compounds such as sulfonamides, amines, β-lactams, indoles, heterocyclic compounds, N-substituted aromatic imides, phthalimides, and other similar compounds. Research on these compounds has focused on their synthesis and biological activity. In the presence of sodium tetrachloroaurate (NaAuCl4), caesium carbonate is very efficient mechanism for aerobic oxidation of different kinds of alcohols into ketones and aldehydes at room temperature without additional polymeric compounds. There is no acid formation produced when primary alcohols are used. The process of selective oxidation of alcohols to carbonyls had been quite difficult due to the nucleophilic character of the carbonyl intermediate. In the past Cr(VI) and Mn(VII) reagents have been used to oxidize alcohols, however, these reagents are toxic and comparatively expensive. Caesium carbonate can also be used in Suzuki, Heck, and Sonogashira synthesis reactions. Caesium carbonate produces carbonylation of alcohols and carbamination of amines more efficiently than some of the mechanisms that have been introduced in the past. Caesium carbonate can be used for sensitive synthesis when a balanced strong base is needed.

For energy conversion

Relatively effective polymer solar cells are built by thermal annealing of caesium carbonate. Caesium carbonate increases the energy effectiveness of the power conversion of solar cells and enhances the life times of the equipment. The studies done on UPS and XPS reveal that the system will do less work due to the thermal annealing of the Cs2CO3 layer. Caesium carbonate breaks down into Cs2O and Cs2O2 by thermal evaporation. It was suggested that, when Cs2O combines with Cs2O2 they produce n-type dopes that supplies additional conducting electrons to the host devices. This produces a highly efficient inverted cell that can be used to further improve the efficiency of polymer solar cells or to design adequate multijunction photovoltaic cells.
The nanostructure layers of Cs2CO3 can be used as cathodes for organic electronic materials due to its capacity to increase the kinetic energy of the electrons. The nanostructure layers of caesium carbonate had been probed for various fields using different techniques. The fields include such as photovoltaic studies, current-voltage measurements, UV photoelectron spectroscopy, X-ray photoelectron spectroscopy, and impedance spectroscopy. The n-type semiconductor produced by thermal evaporation of Cs2CO3 reacts intensively with metals like Al, and Ca in the cathode. This reaction will cut down the work the cathode metals. Polymer solar cells based on solution process are under extensive studies due to their advantage in producing low cost solar cells. Lithium fluoride has been used to raise the power conversion efficiency of polymer solar cells. However, it requires high temperatures (> 500 degree), and high vacuum states raise the cost of production. The devices with Cs2CO3 layers have produced equivalent power conversion efficiency compared with the devices that use lithium fluoride. Placing a Cs2CO3 layer in between the cathode and the light-emitting polymer improves the efficiency of the white OLED.

References

Further reading

External links

Caesium carbonate factsheet from Chemetall GmbH
Material Safety Data Sheet Cesium Carbonate, 99.5%

Caesium compounds
Carbonates
Reagents for organic chemistry